The University System of Taiwan (UST) is a research-led university alliance in Taiwan.

List of institutions
National Tsing Hua University (NTHU)
National Yang Ming Chiao Tung University (NYCU)
National Central University (NCU)
National Chengchi University (NCCU)

Rankings

See also
List of universities in Taiwan
University alliances in Taiwan
Taiwan Comprehensive University System
ELECT
European Union Centre in Taiwan
University System of Taipei
National University System of Taiwan

References

External links
Official website

University systems in Taiwan